Becoming is a 2020 Drama Sci-fi horror film directed by Omar Naim. The film stars Toby Kebbell, Penelope Mitchell and Jason Patric. The film was released on 6 March 2020.

Cast
 Toby Kebbell as Alex Ferri
 Penelope Mitchell as Lisa Corrigan
 Jason Patric as Kevin Lee
 Jeff Daniel Phillips as Glen Hemming
 Melissa Bolona as Annie Hemming
 Beth Broderick as Angela Corrigan
 Lew Temple as Elias Lee

Production
Penelope Mitchell replaced Claire Holt in the movie at the last minute. The film is shot in Kentucky, United States.

References

External links
 

2020 films
2020 science fiction horror films
2020 drama films
American horror drama films
American science fiction horror films
Films shot in Kentucky
2020s English-language films
2020s American films